Sczyapan Yakimavich Krasoŭsky (– 21 April 1983) was a Soviet Air Force marshal of the aviation.

Biography

Early life 
Born to a peasant family, Krasoŭsky was drafted into the Imperial Russian Army at 1916 and participated in the First World War as a communications NCO in an air unit. Soon after the October Revolution, he joined the Red Guards, and later – the Red Army. Joining the Communist party on 1918, Krasoŭsky became an observation pilot, and was appointed commander of the 4th Army's air detachment in October 1919. He took part in the Civil War, fighting in the battles against Admiral Kolchak.

After a diverse service in the Air Force, Krasoŭsky graduated from the Zhukovsky Air Force Engineering Academy at 1936. Afterwards, he supervised the Leningrad Military District's air component. During the Soviet-Finnish War, he commanded the Murmansk Aviation Brigade. At 4 June 1940, while supervising the Krasnodar Military Aviation School of Pilots and Navigators, he was promoted to a major general. In June 1941, he was the chief of the Air Force of the North Caucasus Military District.

World War II 
Soon after the German Invasion, Krasoŭsky was appointed commander of the Air Force of the 56th Army, in August 1941. He also commanded the Air Force of the Bryansk Front, and from November 1942 – the 17th Air Army, that participated in the Battle of Stalingrad. At 20 December that year, he was made a lieutenant general. From March 1943, Krasoŭsky headed the 2nd Air Army, which he led until the war's end. His forces took part in the battles of Kursk, Eastern and Western Ukraine, Silesia and Berlin. On 4 February 1944, he was promoted to Colonel-General. On 29 May 1945, he was awarded the title Hero of the Soviet Union.

Post-war career 
Until 1947, Krasoŭsky remained the commander of the 2nd Air Army. Then, he was assigned as chief of the Air Force in the Far East. In September 1951, he was sent as an advisor to the Chinese Air Force for a year. After a further year as the commander of the Air Forces of the Moscow Military District, he returned to his former duty in the North Caucasus once more. From 1956 until retirement at 1968, Krasoŭsky was the commander of the Gagarin Air Force Academy, receiving his final promotion to Marshal of Aviation on 8 May 1959. He was also a member of the Central Auditing Commission from 1961 to 1966. In July 1970 he was called from retirement to serve as an inspector in the Ministry of Defense.

Honours and awards 
 Hero of the Soviet Union (29 May 1945)
 Six Orders of Lenin
 Order of the October Revolution
 Order of the Red Banner, four times
 Order of Suvorov, 1st and 2nd class
 Order of Kutuzov, 1st class
 Order of Bogdan Khmelnitsky, 1st class
 Order of the Red Star
 Order for Service to the Homeland in the Armed Forces of the USSR, 3rd class

References

External links 
 Sczyapan Krasoŭsky on the Heroes of the USSR list.

1897 births
1983 deaths
People from Bykhaw District
People from Bykhovsky Uyezd
Central Committee of the Communist Party of the Soviet Union members
Soviet Air Force marshals
Russian military personnel of World War I
Soviet military personnel of the Russian Civil War
Soviet military personnel of World War II
Heroes of the Soviet Union
Recipients of the Order of Lenin
Recipients of the Order of Suvorov, 1st class
Recipients of the Order of Kutuzov, 1st class
Recipients of the Order of the Red Banner
Recipients of the Order of Bogdan Khmelnitsky (Soviet Union), 1st class
Recipients of the Order of Suvorov, 2nd class
Commanders of the Virtuti Militari
Recipients of the Order of the Cross of Grunwald, 1st class
Recipients of the Order of the White Lion
Recipients of the Czechoslovak War Cross